Frank Passa (1916–2001) was an internationally known American maker of bows and violins (archetier and luthier).

A native of New York City, Frank Passa was born in 1916 to poor Sicilian immigrants. He was a pupil of Simone Fernando Sacconi a very talented violin maker from Italy. Sacconi and his shop (Rembert Wurlitzer Co.) helped develop many of the modern techniques of restoration that are still being used today. About a dozen pupils of his spread out across the United States, and Frank was one of them.
Frank served in the Army during World War II and then began his career in San Francisco crafting and restoring violins and  bows, a job he kept for 51 years until he was forced to retire in 1999 due to illness.

Mr. Passa was also a member of the Family Club of San Francisco and the Entente International Society of Violin and Bow Makers.
"Passa was for many years the best known violin dealer and expert in San Francisco. He had studied bow making with the great Emile Auguste Ouchard as well as Bernard Millant while he was working in New York City. 
He later passed on this valuable knowledge on to younger bow makers such as  Morgan Andersen."

He  died September 11, 2001 in Santa Rosa after a long illness. He was 85.

"Frank Passa was one of the elite American bow makers, who worked in the French tradition of bow making. His work is outstanding."

References

From Violinmaking to Music:The Life & Works of  Simone Fernando Sacconi -  A.C.L.A.P. Cremona
Grove Dictionary
SACCONI,SIMONE FERNANDO - MOSCONI,ANDREA. Simone Fernando Sacconi. Centenary celebration nel centenario della nascita. Cremona, 1995
Loan Exhibition of Stringed Instruments and Bows Commemorating the 70th Birthday of Simone Fernando Sacconi, Schuler Verlagsgesellschaft, Stuttgart, 1966
 Wurlitzer, Rembert

1916 births
2001 deaths
Bow makers
American luthiers
People from New York City